Sitnikovo is a rural locality (a selo) and the administrative center of Sitnikovsky Selsoviet of Bayevsky District, Altai Krai, Russia. The population was 676 as of 2016. There are 7 streets.

Geography 
Sitnikovo is located 31 km south of Bayevo (the district's administrative centre) by road. Soboli is the nearest rural locality.

Ethnicity 
The village is inhabited by Russians and others.

References 

Rural localities in Bayevsky District